Valentino is an album by Canadian band Weeping Tile, released in 1997. It was the band's second and final album for Warner Music Canada. "South of Me" and "Can't Get Off" were released as singles.

Track listing
All songs written by Sarah Harmer.

 "South of Me"
 "Through Yr Radio"
 "Unshaven"
 "Judy G."
 "2" " 
 "I'm Late"
 "Old Perfume"
 "I Repeat"
 "Can't Get Off"
 "Every Good Story"
 "Chicken"
 "Tom's Shoe Repair"
 "Goin' Out"

A French language version of "South of Me", titled "Au sud de moi", was also recorded and released as a B-side on the "South of Me" single.

Personnel
 Sarah Harmer – vocals, guitar
 Luther Wright – guitar, bass, backing vocals
 Sticky – bass, flute, backing vocals
 Cam Giroux – drums, backing vocals

1997 albums
Weeping Tile (band) albums